Mathew Christensen (born 17 July 1996) is a South African cricketer. He made his Twenty20 cricket debut for Eastern Province on 18 September 2015 in the 2015 Africa T20 Cup. In September 2018, he was named in Eastern Province's squad for the 2018 Africa T20 Cup. In September 2019, he was named in Eastern Province's squad for the 2019–20 CSA Provincial T20 Cup. He was the leading run-scorer in the 2019–20 CSA 3-Day Provincial Cup, with 776 runs in ten matches.

References

External links
 

1996 births
Living people
South African cricketers
Eastern Province cricketers
Cricketers from Cape Town